Ken Hale may refer to:

 Kenneth L. Hale (1934–2001), American linguist
 Ken Hale (footballer) (1939–2015), English football manager
 Gorilla-Man, alias Kenneth Hale, Marvel Comics character